Arthur Green is an American rabbi and scholar.

Arthur Green may also refer to:

 Arthur Green (bishop) (1857–1944), Anglican bishop
 Arthur Green (British Army officer) (1878–?), author and British general
 Arthur Green (footballer, born 1885) (1885–?), English footballer with Birmingham
 Arthur Green (footballer, born 1928) (1928–1992), English footballer with Huddersfield Town
 Arthur Green (musician), American musician, plays for Living Sacrifice
 Arthur Green (Welsh footballer) (1881–1966), Welsh footballer
 Arthur George Green (1864–1941), British organic chemist
 Art Green (artist) (born 1941), professor and painter
 Art Green (Canadian football) (born 1948), CFL football player
 Art Green (ice hockey) (1921–2003), British ice hockey player

See also
 Arthur Greene, American pianist and educator
 Arthur C. Greene (1881–1958), member of the Iowa House of Representatives